The 2014 CAF Super Cup (also known as the 2014 Orange CAF Super Cup for sponsorship reasons) was the 22nd CAF Super Cup, an annual football match in Africa organized by the Confederation of African Football (CAF), between the winners of the previous season's two CAF club competitions, the CAF Champions League and the CAF Confederation Cup.

The match was played between Al-Ahly of Egypt, the 2013 CAF Champions League winner, and CS Sfaxien of Tunisia, the 2013 CAF Confederation Cup winner. It was hosted by Al-Ahly at the Cairo International Stadium in Cairo on 20 February 2014. The match was initially scheduled to be played at the Cairo International Stadium on 22 February 2014. Later, the CAF announced a change of venue and date, with the match scheduled to be played at the 30 June Stadium in Cairo on 20 February 2014. After the rejection of the 30 June Stadium to host the match, the CAF announced that the venue was moved back to the Cairo International Stadium.

Al-Ahly won the match 3–2 to claim their 6th CAF Super Cup.

Teams

Rules
The CAF Super Cup was played as a single match, with the CAF Champions League winner hosting the match. If the score was tied at the end of regulation, a penalty shoot-out was used to determine the winner (no extra time was played).

Match

References

External links
Orange CAF Super Cup 2014, CAFonline.com

2014
Super
Al Ahly SC matches
CS Sfaxien matches
CAF Super Cup